8 x 45 is an Austrian television series.

See also 
 List of Austrian television series

External links 
 

Austrian television series
ORF (broadcaster)
2006 Austrian television series debuts
2006 Austrian television series endings
2000s Austrian television series
German-language television shows